Abdelhali "Appie" Chaiat (born 15 November 1983) is a Dutch-Moroccan former professional footballer. His final professional contract was with Dutch second division side AGOVV Apeldoorn, where he left in 2011. He played as a striker.

Career

Utrecht
Chaiat began his professional career at FC Utrecht. On 11 April 2003, he made his debut in an Eredivisie-match against Willem II which ended 1–1. In his first season in Utrecht, he played seven league-matches and scored two goals. The following year, he was mostly on the bench or a reserve.

Volendam and De Graafschap
In the 2004–05 season, Chaiat was signed by FC Volendam, who then played in the Eerste Divisie. He stayed in Volendam for four years and eventually won the league in 2008, and therefore promotion to the Eredivisie. Subsequently, Chaiat becomes heavily injured in a friendly against the Suriprofs. De Graafschap had already signed him on a pre-contract prior to the injury. On 20 July 2010, his contract was terminated after he gained too much weight, after more than a year of medical rehabilitation, since the injury.

AGOVV
Hereafter, Chaiat signed a contract with AGOVV Apeldoorn.

He later played for amateur sides FC Presikhaaf and NVC.

Honours
Utrecht
KNVB Cup: 2002–03, 2003–04

De Graafschap
 Eerste Divisie: 2009–10

References

External links
Abdelhali Chaiat at Voetbal International

1983 births
Living people
People from Fès-Meknès
Dutch sportspeople of Moroccan descent
Association football forwards
Dutch footballers
Moroccan footballers
FC Utrecht players
FC Volendam players
De Graafschap players
AGOVV Apeldoorn players
Eredivisie players
Eerste Divisie players